European route E 58 is a road part of the International E-road network. It begins in Vienna, Austria and ends in Rostov-na-Donu, Russia.

Route 

: Vienna - Fischamend - Bruck an der Leitha
: Bruck an der Leitha - / border

: / border (Start of Concurrency with E75) - Bratislava
: (Start of Concurrency with E571) Bratislava - Senec - Trnava 
: (End of Concurrency with E75) Trnava - Nitra - Zvolen
: Zvolen - Vigľaš - Lučenec - Rimavská Sobota - Figa
: Figa - Tornaľa
: Tornaľa - Rožňava - Košice (End of Concurrency with E571)
: (Start of Concurrency with E50) Košice
: Košice - Michalovce - / border

: / border - Uzhorod 
: (End of Concurrency with E50) Uzhorod - Serednje - Mukachevo
: (Start of Concurrency with E81) Mukachevo - Berehove
: Berehove - Bene - Vylok
: Vylok - Pyiterfolovo - Nevetlenfolu - / border

: / border - Dragușeni (End of Concurrency with E81)- Baia Mare -  - Bizușa-Băi - Dej
: Dej - Bistrița - Piatra Fântânele - Poiana Stampei - Păltinoasa - Suceava - Ițcani (in Suceava) - Suceava
: Suceava - Botoșani
: Botoșani - Târgu Frumos
: Târgu Frumos - Iași
: Iași - Cotu Morii - Sculeni - / border

: / border  - Sculeni
: Sculeni - Petresti - Ungheni - Pîrlița - Bahmut - Călărași - Straseni - Trușeni - Chișinău (Start of Concurrency with E581)
: Chișinău
: Interchange with M14, M21
: Stǎuceni - Gura Bodului - Entering  - Tiraspol - Pervomaisc - / border

: / border - Odessa (End of Concurrency with E581)
: Odessa - Mykolaiv
: Mykolaiv
: Mykolaiv - Kherson - Nova Kakhovka - Melitopol' - Pryazovs'ke - Prymors'k - Manhush - Mariupol' - Novoazovsk - / border

: / border - Taganrog - Chaltyr - Rostov-on-Don

References

External links 
 UN Economic Commission for Europe: Overall Map of E-road Network (2007)

E058
E058
E058
E058
European routes in Ukraine
E58
58